Antonio del Valle Ruiz (born 1938) is a Mexican businessman, chairman of the chemicals company Mexichem.

Early life
Antonio del Valle Ruiz was born in Mexico. He graduated with a degree in accounting from the Escuela Bancaria y Comercial.

Career
According to Forbes, del Valle Ruiz has a net worth of $4.2 billion, as of January 2015.

Personal life
He is married with five children and lives in Mexico City.

References 

1938 births
Living people
Mexican businesspeople
Mexican billionaires
People from Mexico City